Sweden women's national bandy team represent Sweden in the Women's Bandy World Championship in the winter team sport of bandy. The team is controlled by the Swedish Bandy Association. Sweden won the first ever world championship for women in 2004.

History
The first recorded international match between women's bandy teams from Sweden and Finland took place in Helsinki, Finland in 1935 at the Helsingfors Ice Stadium, where a portion of the match was captured by British Pathé. Another international friendly between women's national teams was played in Kemi in 1980, where Sweden beat Finland by 14-3.

Women's Bandy World Championship
The team has participated in all Women's Bandy World Championships since the first tournament in 2004. The team has won every championship tournament except in 2014, when they lost the final to Russia.

For the 2016 Women's Bandy World Championship, the team got an official song, "Watch Out" by Furfobia.

See also
Bandy
Rink bandy
Women's Bandy World Championship
Great Britain women's national bandy team
United States women's national bandy team
Russia women's national bandy team
Finland women's national bandy team
Norway women's national bandy team
Switzerland women's national bandy team
China women's national bandy team
Canada women's national bandy team
Hungary women's national bandy team
Soviet Union women's national bandy team

References

Women's national team
National bandy teams
W